A by-election was held for the New South Wales Legislative Assembly electorate of Bankstown on 31 January 1987 following the resignation of sitting Labor party member, Ric Mochalski who was facing charges over the collapse of a property trust. Mochalski gave the reason for his resignation as ill health, however the NSW Parliamentary Superannuation Fund rejected a claim based on ill health following a report from the NSW Chief Medical Officer.

The Bankstown by-election was held the same day as the Heathcote by-election.

Dates

Results

Labor party member Ric Mochalski resigned.

See also
Electoral results for the district of Bankstown
List of New South Wales state by-elections

Notes

References 

1987 elections in Australia
New South Wales state by-elections
1980s in New South Wales